Andres Castillo was the second Governor of the Central Bank of the Philippines from 1961 to 1967.

References

Possibly living people
Year of birth missing
Governors of the Bangko Sentral ng Pilipinas
Ferdinand Marcos administration personnel
Macapagal administration personnel
Garcia administration personnel